Elijah Viers "Lige" White (August 29, 1832 – January 11, 1907) was commander of the partisan 35th Battalion of Virginia Cavalry during the American Civil War. His men became commonly known as "White's Comanches" for their war cries and sudden raids on enemy targets.

Early life
Elijah White was born in the area of Poolesville, Maryland. White was a 1854 graduate of what is now Denison University in Granville, Ohio.

In 1855, White moved to Missouri to fight in the border wars with Kansas. The following year, he returned home and bought the  Ball farm across the Potomac River in Loudoun County, Virginia, in the vicinity of the Big Spring north of Leesburg.

Civil War

At the outbreak of the Civil War, White enlisted in Captain Daniel T. Shreve's Loudoun Cavalry, where he quickly rose to the rank of corporal. His service with the unit was short, and in June 1861 he joined Company C in Lt. Col. Turner Ashby's 7th Virginia Cavalry. While home on furlough, White served as an aide and scout for Col. Eppa Hunton's 8th Virginia Infantry during the Battle of Ball's Bluff, which took place near his farm. For his invaluable service in the fight, White was given a captain's commission and granted permission to raise a company of men from Loudoun County for border service in the Provisional Army of the Confederacy.

The 35th
In December 1861, White established recruiting offices for his command in Leesburg, and by January 11 he had raised enough men to have an active unit in the army. He was ordered to scout around Waterford. Two months later on March 19, the Comanches had enough members to be formally organized as the 35th Battalion of Virginia Cavalry. Although raised for border service and highly involved in the partisan fighting in Loudoun County, Elijah White and the 35th were quickly mustered into regular service and fought in several major campaigns and battles, including Jackson's Valley Campaign and the Battle of Brandy Station. The 35th Battalion was one of the first Confederate units to arrive in Gettysburg, chasing off Pennsylvania militia on June 26, 1863, during an expedition to the Susquehanna River.

For the final months of the war, Elijah White and the 35th were a part of the celebrated "Laurel Brigade." Following the Battle of High Bridge on April 6, 1865, in which General James Dearing was fatally wounded, White was placed in command of that brigade. Four days later, White disbanded the Laurel Brigade and the 35th. Nearly a month later on May 8, White was paroled in Winchester.

Postbellum life
After the war, White returned to Loudoun County a hero and resumed his farming operations. In 1866 he successfully ran for county sheriff. The four-year term was the only time in public office that White would spend. He served as President of Peoples National Bank of Leesburg for a time and also took over operation of Conrad's Ferry, changing the name to White's Ferry, which still operates today.

White died January 11, 1907, and is buried in Union Cemetery in Leesburg.

References

35th Battalion Virginia Cavalry website

External links

1832 births
1907 deaths
People from Loudoun County, Virginia
People from Montgomery County, Maryland
Loudoun County in the American Civil War
People of Virginia in the American Civil War
Confederate States Army officers
Farmers from Virginia
Farmers from Maryland
Virginia sheriffs
Military personnel from Maryland